Crazy Love (Ai Qing Kuang Xiang Qu) is a 2014 Chinese romantic comedy film directed by Cong Yi. It was released on November 28, 2014.

Cast
Lee Wei
Su Xiaomei
Tong Yixuan
Fu Man
Qin Hanlei
Cui Wenlu
Yu Jinlong

Reception

Box office
By December 8, 2014, the film had earned ¥0.54 million at the Chinese box office.

References

2014 romantic comedy films
Chinese romantic comedy films